The 1985 East Texas State Lions football team represented East Texas State University—now known as Texas A&M University–Commerce—as a member of the Lone Star Conference (LSC) during the 1985 NCAA Division II football season. Led by Ernest Hawkins in his 22nd and final season as head coach, the Lions compiled an overall record of 5–5 with a mark of 2–3 in conference play, tying for fourth place in the LSC. East Texas State played home games at Memorial Stadium in Commerce, Texas.

Schedule

Postseason awards

All-Lone Star Conference

LSC First Team
Dexter Branch, Defensive Line
Mark Copeland, Linebacker
Wes Smith, Wide Receiver 
Vincent Stowers, Defensive Back
Donnie White, Linebacker

LSC Second Team
Robert Giddens, Tight End
Frank Haggarty, Defensive Line
Donald Lee, Running Back
Nathan McClure, Offensive Tackle
Lawrence Motten, Defensive Tackle
Mike Trigg, Quarterback

LSC Honorable Mention
Lynn Herrick, Offensive Tackle 
Robert Kubicek, Defensive Line

References

East Texas State
Texas A&M–Commerce Lions football seasons
East Texas State Lions football